The Anglican Church of SS Peter & Paul, Weston in Gordano, Somerset, England, has been designated as a Grade I listed building.

The tower and porch were built around 1300, while the rest of the building is from the 15th century, with the work being funded by Sir Richard Percivale who died in 1483 and whose tomb is in the north isle of the nave.

It has a four-bay nave, chancel and south chapel. The four stage tower is at the southern end of the church.

The interior of the church includes the original Norman font and a stone pulpit from the 13th century, there is also a Jacobean pulpit on the north side.  The misericords have been dated as coming from the 14th century, although some suggest they may be 12th and transferred from Portbury Priory.

The parish is part of the benefice of East Clevedon with Clapton in Gordano, Walton Clevedon, Walton in Gordano and Weston in Gordano within the Portishead deanery.

See also

 Grade I listed buildings in North Somerset
 List of Somerset towers
 List of ecclesiastical parishes in the Diocese of Bath and Wells

References

15th-century church buildings in England
Church of England church buildings in North Somerset
Grade I listed churches in Somerset
Grade I listed buildings in North Somerset